Monterey is an unincorporated community in Rankin County, Mississippi, United States.

History
The settlement was named after a battle fought at Monterrey, Mexico, by soldiers returning from the Mexican–American War.

Monterey had a post office from 1847 to 1867.

The population in 1900 was 36.

Monterey Methodist Church, and the Monterey Volunteer Fire Department, are both located at the settlement.

References

Unincorporated communities in Rankin County, Mississippi
Unincorporated communities in Mississippi